Archana Reddy (born 5 July 1980) is a former Fijian female tennis player. She made her international debut in 1999 by representing Fiji in Fed Cup at the age of 19. Reddy is considered as the best woman tennis player to play for Fiji. 

She holds the record by winning the most singles, doubles for Fijian Fed Cup team.

ITF Junior Finals

Singles Finals (0–2)

References

External links 
 

1980 births
Living people
Fijian female tennis players
Sportspeople from Lautoka